Robert Hobart (1836–1928) was a British politician.

Robert Hobart may also refer to:
Robert Hobart, 4th Earl of Buckinghamshire (1760–1816), British politician
Sir Robert Hampden Hobart, 3rd Baronet (1915–1988) of the Hobart baronets

See also
Hobart (disambiguation)